Gurvan, also known as Guzvan, may refer to:
 Gurvan-e Bozorg
 Gurvan-e Kuchak